Mandai Wildlife Group is a self-funded organisation based in Singapore which manages the majority of zoos in the country. Founded as Wildlife Reserves Singapore in 2000, it currently manages the Singapore Zoo, Night Safari, River Wonders, and the Bird Paradise in Singapore.

On 13 October 2021, as part of a corporate rebranding, Wildlife Reserves Singapore was renamed to Mandai Wildlife Group. In addition, the River Safari was renamed River Wonders, while the Jurong Bird Park was renamed to Bird Paradise.

Mandai Wildlife Group and all of its member institutions are members of the South East Asian Zoos and Aquariums Association (SEAZA).

References

External links
 

2000 establishments in Singapore
Organizations established in 2000
Wildlife sanctuaries of Asia
Temasek Holdings
Singaporean brands